Nikita Sergeyevich Kirsanov (born 4 January 1995) is a Russian football player who plays as an midfielder for FC Volga Ulyanovsk.

Club career
He made his debut in the Russian Professional Football League for FC Khimki on 20 July 2015 in a game against FC Dynamo St. Petersburg.

He made his Russian Football National League debut for Khimki on 16 July 2016 in a game against FC Tambov.

References

External links
 Profile by Russian Professional Football League
 

1995 births
People from Gukovo
Sportspeople from Rostov Oblast
Living people
Russian footballers
Association football midfielders
FC Khimki players
FC Torpedo Moscow players
FC Nosta Novotroitsk players
FC Veles Moscow players
FC Tom Tomsk players
FC KAMAZ Naberezhnye Chelny players
FC Volga Ulyanovsk players
Russian First League players
Russian Second League players
Competitors at the 2019 Summer Universiade